This is a list of the National Register of Historic Places listings in Great Basin National Park.

This is intended to be a complete list of the properties and districts on the National Register of Historic Places in Great Basin National Park, Nevada, United States.  The locations of National Register properties and districts for which the latitude and longitude coordinates are included below, may be seen in a Google map.

There are five properties and districts listed on the National Register in the park.

Current listings 

|}

See also 
 National Register of Historic Places listings in Nevada

References